The first 19 locomotives ordered by Isambard Kingdom Brunel for the Great Western Railway included two unusual Haigh Foundry locomotives.

Snake and Viper were built at the Haigh Foundry and delivered in September 1838. They had  cylinders and the driving wheels geared 2:3 to keep the cylinder stroke speed low while allowing high track speed, in line with Brunel's specifications. Most probably they received their  driving wheels at the same time. They were later converted to 2-2-2T tank locomotives, possibly when they were sent to work the South Devon Railway in 1846, where they got the names Exe and Teign. The locomotives returned 1851. Snake operated till November 1869, Viper till January 1868. The boiler of Viper was afterwards used as stationary boiler in Shrewsbury.

Names
 Snake (Haigh Foundry 25; 1838–1869)
Between 1846 and 1851 it carried a different name, Exe, while working on the South Devon Railway, after the River Exe; it reverted to Snake when it returned to the Great Western Railway.
 Viper (Haigh Foundry 26; 1838–1868)
Between 1846 and 1851 it carried a different name, Teign, while working on the South Devon Railway, after the River Teign; it reverted to Viper when it returned to the Great Western Railway.

References

Sources
 
 

Haigh Foundry
Broad gauge (7 feet) railway locomotives
2-2-2 locomotives
Early steam locomotives
Steam locomotives of Great Britain
Railway locomotives introduced in 1838